Ulus Sedat Baker (July 14, 1960 in Ankara, Turkey – July 12, 2007 in İstanbul, Turkey) was a Turkish Cypriot sociologist. Baker was born to a cosmopolitan family; his mother was the Cypriot poet Pembe Marmara, and his father was the prominent psychiatrist of the island, Sedat Baker. Baker studied in Russia (then the Soviet Union), Turkey, France, and Cyprus.  He completed his studies at the Department of Sociology in METU in Ankara and began his academic life in the same institution shortly thereafter. He was a very productive intellectual and a prolific scholar; he had already become an influential public intellectual in Turkish cultural life beyond the academia by mid-nineties. Although he had always taught within academic institutions, his relation with academia had certain tensions and breaks; he only completed his Ph.D. in 2002 with a thesis titled "From Opinions to Images: Towards a Sociology of Affects", he was uninterested in having a stable academic position, and after 2000 till his death, he had various teaching gigs in different universities in Ankara and Istanbul besides his main affiliation at Middle East Technical University. Shortly before his death, he also started teaching in Istanbul, where he died.

Baker was an influential figure in contemporary political theory in Turkey, both as a prolific author, and as a professor of sociology, media, and film theory. From late 80's till his death, he frequently wrote for major Turkish scholarly journals such as Birikim, Toplum ve Bilim, Virgül, and Defter. He was a polyglot, his fields of interest ranged from literary criticism to the cinema of Dziga Vertov. He significantly contributed to the rise of interest in the philosophy of Gilles Deleuze and Baruch Spinoza through a variety of translations and lecture series. His political commitments inspired him to take part in the founding of Autonomist political/artistic collective Körotonomedya in 1994 with other Ankara-based scholars, students and artists of that time. Körotonomedya collective has been among the forerunners of experimental new media and video art in Turkey, and Baker's work within the collective became a major theoretical resource in these fields.

, Baker was teaching modern visual arts and visual thinking at GİSAM (Audio Visual Systems Research and Production Centre) of METU and at  Istanbul Bilgi University. He died on July 12, 2007 in Istanbul after being hospitalized for chronic liver deficiency.

Besides a multitude of articles in various publications, Baker's published works include; What is Opinion? (Pyromedia, 2001), Aşındırma Denemeleri (Birikim Yayınları, Istanbul, 2002), Siyasal Alanın Oluşumu Üzerine Bir Deneme (Paragraf Yayınları, Ankara, 2005).

External links 
 What is Opinion? a video lecture by Baker
 Körotonomedya website of the collective
 A collection of Ulus Baker's articles at Korotonomedya 
 Art & Desire Seminars An international seminar series in memory of Ulus Baker, organized by Korotonomedia, Norgunk Publishers and KozaVisual.
 Ulus Baker at METU Academic Staff Catalogue
 Modvisart Modern Visual Arts course blog

1960 births
2007 deaths
Turkish people of Cypriot descent
Middle East Technical University alumni
Academic staff of Middle East Technical University
Turkish Cypriot non-fiction writers
Turkish film critics
Turkish literary critics
Turkish sociologists
Turkish former Muslims
Turkish atheists
Writers from Ankara
Turkish expatriates in Russia
Turkish expatriates in France
Academic staff of Istanbul Bilgi University